Baba Sucha Singh is an Indian politician belonging to Shiromani Akali Dal (Amritsar). He was elected to the Lok Sabha, lower house of the Parliament of India from Bathinda  in Punjab. His son, Beant Singh was the assassin of Indian Prime Minister, Indira Gandhi.

References

External links
Official Biographical Sketch in Lok Sabha Website

Lok Sabha members from Punjab, India
India MPs 1989–1991
Shiromani Akali Dal politicians
Year of birth missing
Possibly living people